Dr. Mann was a Belgian professional cycling team that existed from 1960 to 1970. Its main sponsor was proprietary medicine producer Dr. Mann. Its most notable victory was Herman Van Springel's win of the 1968 Giro di Lombardia.

References

External links

Cycling teams based in Belgium
Defunct cycling teams based in Belgium
1960 establishments in Belgium
1970 disestablishments in Belgium
Cycling teams established in 1960
Cycling teams disestablished in 1970